Garra yiliangensis is a species of ray-finned fish in the genus Garra from Yunnan. The species is known only from the type specimen which was collected in the 1960s from a hill stream in Yunnan and was formally described in 1977.

References 

Garra
Fish described in 1977